Radomir Todorov (born 11 August 1980 in Varna) is a Bulgarian former footballer who played as a midfielder.

Career
Todorov left Khazar Lankaran, at the end of his two-year contract, in December 2013.

Career statistics

Honours

Player
 Khazar Lankaran
 Azerbaijan Cup (1) - 2007-08
 Azerbaijan Supercup (1) - 2013

References

External links
 
 2004-05 Statistics & 2003-04 Statistics at PFL.bg

1981 births
Living people
Bulgarian footballers
PFC Spartak Varna players
Neftochimic Burgas players
PFC Chernomorets Burgas players
Khazar Lankaran FK players
FC Baku players
First Professional Football League (Bulgaria) players
Azerbaijan Premier League players
Association football defenders
Bulgarian expatriate footballers
Expatriate footballers in Azerbaijan
Bulgarian expatriate sportspeople in Azerbaijan